Volcano Lake, formerly called Crater Lake, is a lake on Vancouver Island, British Columbia, Canada, located just south of Puzzle Mountain and west of Elkhorn Mountain on west side of Strathcona Provincial Park.  The name is a misnomer – the lake is the result of glaciation.

References

Lakes of Vancouver Island
Glacial lakes of Canada
Nootka Land District